The discography of Adam Brand, an Australian country singer, consists of sixteen studio albums, three compilation album and three live album

As of 2013, Adam Brand has achieved a sales history of over half a million albums and DVDs.

Albums

Studio albums

Compilation albums

Video albums

Singles

Singles as lead artist

Guest singles

References

Country music discographies
Discographies of Australian artists